The 2001–02 Xavier Musketeers men's basketball team represented Xavier University from Cincinnati, Ohio in the 2001–02 season. Led by head coach Thad Matta, the Musketeers finished 22–5 (14–2 A10) in the regular season, and won the Atlantic 10 tournament. In the NCAA tournament, the Musketeers defeated Hawaii in the first round before losing to eventual Final Four participant Oklahoma.

Roster

Schedule and results

|-
!colspan=9 style=| Regular season

|-
!colspan=9 style=| Atlantic 10 Tournament

|-
!colspan=9 style=| NCAA Tournament

Rankings

References

Xavier
Xavier Musketeers men's basketball seasons
Xavier